Gabriel Odenhammar (born 23 November 1983) is a Swedish actor known for his role as Sune's brother Håkan in Sunes jul and Sune's Summer.

References

External links 

1983 births
Living people
Swedish male child actors
Swedish male film actors
Swedish male voice actors